Sam Watkins is an American epic fantasy writer who publishes fiction as Sam Sykes.

He is the son of  Diana Gabaldon, author of the Outlander series.

Reception
His debut trilogy of novels, the Aeons' Gate series, was appreciated by critics for its characterization and dialogue, and for its deconstruction of standard fantasy tropes, but criticized for its meandering, derivative plot.

Controversy
 
In 2020, multiple authors, including Megan O'Keefe, accused Sykes of making "gross, sexual comments" at various conventions over the years. Sykes issued an apology, acknowledging "the harm [he] caused through [his] vulgar and sexual words, [his] poor judgment and [his] lack of respect for [his] colleagues." In response, his publisher Orbit Books announced that they would not be acquiring further books from Sykes and would not be arranging or supporting any public appearances for Sykes, including at conventions. Both Sykes and Orbit Books pledged to donate a portion of the profits from Sykes' books.

Bibliography

Aeons' Gate series
Tome of the Undergates (2010), 
Black Halo (2011), 
The Skybound Sea (2012), 
"Name the Beast", short story in the 2013 cross-genre anthology Dangerous Women

Bring Down Heaven series
The City Stained Red (2015)
The Mortal Tally (2016)
God's Last Breath (2017)

The Grave of Empires series
Seven Blades in Black (April 2019)
The Gallows Black (May 2019), a short novella set before Seven Blades of Black
Ten Arrows of Iron (August 2020)
Three Axes to Fall (December 2022)

References

External links

1988 births
21st-century American novelists
American fantasy writers
American male novelists
Living people
21st-century American male writers